James Tedder (born 18 April 1997) is a South African rugby union player for the  in the Currie Cup. His regular position is fly-half.

Tedder was named in the  side for the 2022 Currie Cup Premier Division.

References

South African rugby union players
Living people
Rugby union fly-halves
Golden Lions players
1997 births
Lions (United Rugby Championship) players
Soyaux Angoulême XV Charente players